Paola De Luca (born November 18, 1966) is an Italian luxury trends forecaster known for developing a trend book on global jewellery design. She has also worked as a jewellery designer and has been the Design Director of Rio Tinto Diamonds since 2010.

De Luca is the founder of The Futurist Ltd., a research and creative intelligence company that carries out projects for clients in the global luxury sector. De Luca leads design projects and educational programs for buyers and government organisations and gives seminars forecasting global jewelry design trends at international trade fairs.

She was a pioneer in jewellery design trend forecasting reports, which she started as in-house research while working for UnoAErre, a leading Italian goldsmith and manufacturer. De Luca studied goldsmithing, metalwork, fashion, and art design in Rome before moving to New York City in her early 20s. There she worked as a fashion and design director for UnoAErre and other brands such as Fendi.

Career

De Luca traces her roots as a jewellery designer to her upbringing and education in Rome. As a teenager, she would wander around the Via Condotti neighborhood after school, fascinated by the latest fashions and accessories on display in the shop windows of Rome’s fashion district near the Spanish Steps.

De Luca established TJF Group Ltd, a research company primarily focused on global jewelry design trends, in partnership with CRU Group of London, in 2002. For a decade, TJF Group focused on researching jewelry branding and design trends and published TJF Magazine, a glossy print periodical distributed to the international jewelry trade. TJF Group launched the "TJF Trend Book,"  one of the world's first authoritative jewelry trends publications, which forecasts global design themes up to two seasons into the future, based on extensive industry research.

References

1966 births
Living people
Italian jewellery designers
Italian businesspeople in fashion